Max Mathiasin (born 24 February 1956) is a French politician who has been a member of the National Assembly since 2017, representing Guadeloupe's 3rd constituency.

References 

Living people
1956 births
Deputies of the 15th National Assembly of the French Fifth Republic
Deputies of the 16th National Assembly of the French Fifth Republic
Black French politicians
Guadeloupean politicians
People from Deshaies